The Earth is Enough is a novel by author Harry Middleton. The book chronicles Middleton's young life in the Ozark mountains, and was published in March 1989 by the Pruett Publishing Company.

Notes

1995 American novels
Novels set in Arkansas